Trichromia metachryseis is a moth of the family Erebidae first described by George Hampson in 1905. It is found in French Guinea and Suriname.

References

metachryseis
Moths described in 1905